"After the Afterparty" is a single by British singer Charli XCX featuring American rapper Lil Yachty. It was released on 28 October 2016 by Asylum Records and Atlantic Records UK intended as the lead single from XCX's scrapped third studio album, commonly referred to by fans as XCX World. However, the song became a stand-alone single when tracks from the project were leaked online and the album was ultimately cancelled.

Critical reception
Ailbhe Malone of The Irish Times called the song "a turned-up banger, similar to 'We Can't Stop' by Miley Cyrus", but also claiming that it had a "layer of modernist gloss" due to the input of Sophie. Laura Snapes of Pitchfork described the song's "neon nihilism and aggressive self-possession are the drivers of Charli's career rather than its destructors" and commented on Charli's vocals at the end of track beginning to "slip and stutter". NME named it the tenth best song of 2016 on their year-end list.

Music video
The music video for "After the Afterparty" was released on 30 October 2016. The video was directed by Diane Martel, and features XCX and Yachty partying with people dressed as zombies and other creatures for Halloween. A. G. Cook and Sophie both appear in the video as zombies.

Live performances
In November 2016, XCX sang "After the Afterparty" during the finale of The X Factor Australia. On 8 February 2017, XCX also performed it on Jimmy Kimmel Live!.

Track listing

Charts

Certifications

References

2016 songs
2016 singles
Asylum Records singles
Atlantic Records singles
Warner Music Group singles
Charli XCX songs
Lil Yachty songs
Song recordings produced by Stargate (record producers)
Song recordings produced by Sophie (musician)
Songs written by Charli XCX
Songs written by Raye (singer)
Music videos directed by Diane Martel
Songs written by Lil Yachty
Songs written by Fred Again
Songs written by Mikkel Storleer Eriksen
Songs written by Tor Erik Hermansen
Songs written by Sophie (musician)